Əlicanlı (also, Alidzhamli, Alidzhanli, and Alidzhanly) is a village and municipality in the Sabirabad Rayon of Azerbaijan.  It has a population of 1.

References 

Populated places in Sabirabad District